Bryochoerus intermedius is a species of tardigrade of the family Echiniscidae. It is one of two species of the genus Bryochoerus. The species was first described by James Murray in 1910 as Echiniscus intermedius.

Subspecies
It has three subspecies:
 Bryochoerus intermedius intermedius (Murray, 1910)
 Bryochoerus intermedius hawaiicus (Thulin, 1928)
 Bryochoerus intermedius laevis (Marcus, 1936)

References

Further reading

 Marcus, 1936 : Tardigrada. Das Tierreich [The Animal Kingdom], vol. 66, p. 1-340.
 Murray, 1910 : Tardigrada. British Antarctic Exped. 1907-9 under the command of Sir E. H. Shackleton, C.V.O. Reports on the Scientific Investigations, vol. 1, no. 5, p. 83-185.
 Thulin, 1928 : Über die Phylogenie und das System der Tardigraden. [On the Phylogeny and the System of Tardigrades] Hereditas, vol. 11, no. 2/3, p. 207-266.

Echiniscidae
Invertebrates of Europe
Invertebrates of Hawaii
Invertebrates of Australia
Invertebrates of Brazil
Animals described in 1936